James Horton may refer to:

 James Horton (Highlander), fictional character from Highlander: The Series
James Horton (Medal of Honor, 1864) (1840 - 1894) Union Navy sailor who received the Medal of Honor for bravery
 James Horton (Medal of Honor, 1879) (1850–?), United States Navy sailor who received the Medal of Honor for bravery
 James Edwin Horton (1878–1973), judge in Alabama
 James Horton (footballer, born 1907) (1907–1972), English footballer with Aldershot, Millwall and Southampton
 James Horton (footballer, born 1909) English footballer with Newark, Bradford City and Boston
 Jimmy Horton (born 1956), American racecar driver